Heteronida barunae is a species of squat lobster in the family Munididae. It is named for the research vessel "Baruna Jaya I".

References

Squat lobsters
Crustaceans described in 1996